Ryan Fanti (born October 3, 1999) is a Canadian ice hockey goaltender for the Bakersfield Condors of the AHL as a prospect for the Edmonton Oilers of the National Hockey League (NHL). He played college ice hockey for Minnesota Duluth.

Playing career

Collegiate
Fanti began his collegiate career for Minnesota Duluth during the 2019–20 season, however, he did not appear in any games. During the 2020–21 season, he appeared in 20 games, with 19 starts, and posted a 10–6–2 record with a 2.40 goals against average (GAA) and .907 save percentage.

During the  2021–22 season he posted a 20–12–4 record with a 1.83 GAA and .929 save percentage. He ranked second in conference-only save percentage at .918 and first with a 2.13 GAA in 23 starts. Fanti was named the NCHC Goaltender of the Month and Hockey Commissioners Association's National Goaltender of the Month for the month of November.  He started all eight games for the Bulldogs, while posting a 5–2–1 record with four shutouts, a .957 save percentage and 1.00 GAA, ranking him top five in the nation in both statistics. He became the first Bulldogs player to record three consecutive shutouts since Hunter Shepard during the 2017–18 season. 

During the 2022 NCHC Tournament he posted consecutive shutouts in the semifinals and championship game, to help the Bulldogs advance to the 2022 NCAA Tournament. He was subsequently named to the NCHC All-Tournament Team and named the Frozen Faceoff MVP. Following an outstanding season, he was named to the All-NCHC First Team and NCHC Goaltender of the Year. He was also named a Mike Richter Award semifinalist and an AHCA West Second Team All-American.

Professional
On March 28, 2022, Fanti signed a two-year contract with the Edmonton Oilers beginning with the 2022–23 season. He was assigned to the Fort Wayne Komets of the AHL on an amateur tryout contract for the remainder of the 2021–22 season.

Career statistics

Awards and honours

References

External links
 

1999 births
Living people
AHCA Division I men's ice hockey All-Americans
Bakersfield Condors players
Fort Wayne Komets players
Ice hockey people from Ontario
Minnesota Duluth Bulldogs men's ice hockey players
Minnesota Wilderness players
Sportspeople from Thunder Bay